Cafe24 (카페24), a global e-commerce platform, offers merchants a one-stop shop for creating an online DTC (Direct-to-Consumer) store. Cafe24 provides a variety of services to assist merchants in selling their products to global markets, ranging from web hosting and online store-building tools to marketing and logistics. Cafe24 also offers e-commerce services through global partners such as Google, Facebook, Baidu, and Yahoo. Cafe24 also supports English, Spanish, Portuguese, Traditional Chinese, Simplified Chinese, Japanese, Korean, and Vietnamese. Cafe24 is free to use and powers over 2.0 million online stores, making it the market leader.'''

References

External links 
 cafe24 Official Website (English Ver.)
 cafe24 (Korean Ver.)

Online retailers of South Korea